Opatowiec  is a small town in Kazimierza County, Świętokrzyskie Voivodeship, in south-central Poland. It is the seat of the gmina (administrative district) called Gmina Opatowiec. It regained its urban status on 1 January 2019, becoming the smallest town in Poland, with only 338 inhabitants. Opatowiec is situated on the National Road Nr. 79 (Warsaw–Bytom). Local points of interest include a 15th-century Dominican church and a central park.

History
The village of Opatowiec was first mentioned in 1085, when Judyta, the wife of Prince Władysław I Herman, presented it to the Benedictine monks from Tyniec. In 1271, Prince Boleslaw V the Chaste granted Opatowiec a town charter under Magdeburg rights, upon the request of abbot Modlibob. The town became a local trade center, due to its location along the Vistula waterway, and on a merchant trail from Silesia in the west to Kievan Rus in the east. In 1283, abbot Tomasz founded an abbey of the Dominican Order, and in 1341, King Casimir III the Great granted Opatowiec the right to organize trade fairs. In the mid-14th century, Opatowiec was inhabited by around 1,500 people. Here, in 1474, an assembly of Lesser Poland’s nobility took place, during which war with Hungarian king Matthias Corvinus was discussed. In the same year, King Casimir IV hosted at Opatowiec envoys from the Republic of Venice, to discuss war with the Ottoman Empire. By 1500, Opatowiec had a parish church, bath houses, hospital and several guilds. In 1579, it had 55 different workshops, and four mills. For centuries, the town belonged to Wiślica County of Lesser Poland's Sandomierz Voivodeship (province).

Like almost all municipal centers of Lesser Poland, the town was completely destroyed by Swedish soldiers in the Deluge (1655–1660). In 1772, when after the first partition of Poland the Tyniec abbey became part of Austrian Galicia, Opatowiec changed hands and became the property of the government. Soon afterwards, it was purchased by the Walewski family. In 1815, the town was part of Russian-controlled Congress Poland, and began to lose its importance. By 1862, it had only 459 residents and 67 houses. In 1869, as a punishment for the January Uprising, it was stripped of its town charter and became a mere village. Opatowiec suffered during World War I and later further destruction was brought by World War II. In September 1939, the village was burned by the Wehrmacht and on 8 September 1939 German soldiers shot 45 Polish prisoners of war. On 28 July 1944, a skirmish took place here between a local Home Army unit and the Russian Liberation Army under Nazi command. As a result, 31 persons were murdered, including children.

References

Cities and towns in Świętokrzyskie Voivodeship
Kazimierza County
Sandomierz Voivodeship
Kielce Governorate
Kielce Voivodeship (1919–1939)